Nicholas Frank Adduci (July 12, 1929 – November 4, 2005) was an American football defensive back in the National Football League (NFL) for the Washington Redskins.  He played college football at the University of Nebraska.

External links

1929 births
2005 deaths
Players of American football from Chicago
Nebraska Cornhuskers football players
American football defensive backs
Washington Redskins players